Giovanni Linati (1562–1627) was a Roman Catholic prelate who served as Bishop of Piacenza (1619–1627) and Bishop of Borgo San Donnino (1606–1619).

Biography
Giovanni Linati was born in Parma, Italy in 1562.
On 4 December 1606, he was appointed during the papacy of Pope Paul V as Bishop of Borgo San Donnino and was installed on 24 December 1606.
On 13 December 1606, he was consecrated bishop by Carlo Conti, Bishop of Ancona e Numana, with Galeazzo Sanvitale, Archbishop Emeritus of Bari-Canosa, and Claudio Rangoni, Bishop of Piacenza, serving as co-consecrators. 
On 9 October 1619, he was appointed during the papacy of Pope Paul V as Bishop of Piacenza.
He served as Bishop of Piacenza until his death on 3 April 1627.

While bishop, he was the principal co-consecrator of Pompeo Cornazzano, Bishop of Parma (1615).

References

External links and additional sources
 (for Chronology of Bishops) 
 (for Chronology of Bishops) 
 (for Chronology of Bishops) 
 (for Chronology of Bishops)  

17th-century Italian Roman Catholic bishops
Bishops appointed by Pope Paul V
1562 births
1627 deaths